Ágfalva is a village in Hungary, in the north-western Győr-Moson-Sopron region,  4 kilometers from Sopron and two kilometers from the border of Austria.

Ágfalva was first mentioned in a document from 1194. Archaeological evidence proves inhabitation at least since Roman occupation. In 1207 the village is mentioned as Dagendorf, probably the name of the owner. The first church was built in 1265, it was pulled down in 1789 to be replaced by a new church, the catholic St George church (1792). The Protestants received permission to build a church in 1784. Until 1892 the service was in German.

In 1892 the railway to Brennbergbánya was constructed.

Sources 

 Ausflüge in der Umgebung von Sopron. Escort '63 Bt. 2004. P. 21-30

External links 

 
 Street map 

Populated places in Győr-Moson-Sopron County